Jeruzalem is a small settlement in the eastern part of the Slovene Hills in the Municipality of Ljutomer in northeastern Slovenia. The area traditionally belonged to the Styria region and is now included in the Mura Statistical Region.

The local church is a pilgrimage church dedicated to Mary of the Seven Sorrows. It belongs to the parish of Miklavž pri Ormožu. A chapel was built on the site in 1652. In the late 17th century it was extended by converting the chapel to the sanctuary and building a nave. In the 18th century a belfry and a new chapel were added.

References

External links

Jeruzalem on Geopedia

Populated places in the Municipality of Ljutomer